James Crowley or Jim Crowley may refer to:

Sportspeople
James Crowley (athlete), American athlete and distance runner
Jim Crowley (1902–1986), American football player and coach
James Crowley (basketball coach) (1888–1935), coach of the Boston College Eagles men's basketball team
Jim Crowley (jockey) (born 1978), British jockey
Jim Crowley (basketball) (born 1970), head women's basketball coach at Providence College

Others
Jim Crowley (artist), Australian artist in the Progressive Art Movement in Adelaide in the 1970s
James Crowley (politician) (1880–1946), Irish nationalist, politician and veterinary surgeon
James Crowley (police officer), Cambridge, Massachusetts police officer known for the Henry Louis Gates arrest controversy
James Crowley (mathematician) (born 1949), American mathematician
Jimmy Crowley (born 1950), traditional musician from County Cork, Ireland